Robert Roy Garibaldi (born March 3, 1942)  is a former Major League Baseball relief pitcher who played from 1962 to 1963, and in 1966 and 1969.

Garibaldi was born in Stockton, California, and attended Stagg High School and then the Santa Clara University, with whom he won the 1962 College World Series Most Outstanding Player award. He is the only player from Santa Clara University to ever win that award. He also set two records in that Series: a strikeout record (38 strikeout) and an innings-pitched record (27 innings pitched).

Although Casey Stengel of the New York Mets tried to convince Garibaldi to sign with them (he even left a game early to travel to Stockton, California, to try to persuade Garibaldi), Garibaldi chose not to sign with the Mets. Instead, he signed with the Giants. After signing with the San Francisco Giants for a record bonus of $150,000, Garibaldi jumped straight from college to the major leagues, making his big league debut on July 15, 1962. Facing the New York Mets, he pitched a perfect inning in his debut, striking out one batter. He would pitch nine games in 1962, going 0–0 with a 5.11 ERA. He was the ninth youngest player in 1962.

In 1963, Garibaldi went 0–1 with a 1.13 ERA in four games. He would not pitch in the majors again until 1966. In 1966, he appeared in one game, pitching a near-perfect inning of work, allowing a single hit. He'd have to wait until 1969 to play in the big leagues again. Once again, he appeared in only one game, making the only start of his career. Despite pitching five solid innings and posting an ERA of 1.80, he still lost the game because his defense allowed three unearned runs (he allowed four runs total). He played his final major league game on October 1.

Although his big league career was over, his professional career was not. He continued to pitch in the Giants organization until the end of the 1970 season. He was traded to the Kansas City Royals on October 19, 1970 for Fran Healy. In early 1971, he was traded to the San Diego Padres for Mike Jackson. He played for the Padres top farm team, the Hawaii Islanders, in 1971 and  before retiring.

Overall, Garibaldi went 0–2 with a 3.08 ERA in the majors. In 15 games, he had 11 walks and 14 strikeouts. Garibaldi was the last $100,000 Bonus Baby pitcher to never win a game.

While pitching for the Giants' AAA teams in Tacoma and Phoenix from 1963 to 1970, Garibaldi recorded a record of 85–69, with a high of 15 wins in 1970. He tied for the PCL lead in wins, with 13, in 1969, and led the PCL in complete games with 17 in 1969, and 20 in 1970. He was named as pitcher on the National Association All-Star Fielding Silver Glove team by The Sporting News for the 1969 season. He was a player-manager for the Phoenix Giants in 1970.

After his baseball career, he worked for many years as a college basketball referee.

External links
  
The Sports Critics.com

1942 births
American people of Italian descent
Living people
Major League Baseball pitchers
San Francisco Giants players
Baseball players from California
College World Series Most Outstanding Player Award winners
Santa Clara Broncos baseball players
Santa Clara Broncos men's basketball players
San Francisco Warriors draft picks
College men's basketball referees in the United States
American men's basketball players
Tacoma Giants players
Phoenix Giants players
Hawaii Islanders players
Minor league baseball managers